Pereslavl-Zalessky, also known as Pereyaslavl-Zalessky, is a town in Yaroslavl Oblast, Russia, located on the main Moscow–Yaroslavl road and on the southeastern shore of Lake Pleshcheyevo at the mouth of the Trubezh River. Population:

Geography

History
It was founded in 1152 by George I of Vladimir as a projected capital of Zalesye. The inhabitants of the nearby town of Kleshchin were relocated to the new town. 

Between 1175 and 1302, Pereslavl was the seat of a principality (not to be confused with the Principality of Pereyaslavl in modern-day Ukraine). In 1302, it became a part of the Grand Duchy of Moscow. Pereslavl-Zalessky was devastated numerous times by the Mongols between the mid-13th century and the early 15th century. In 1611–1612, it suffered from the Polish invasion.

In 1688–1693, Peter the Great built his famous "fun flotilla" on Lake Pleshcheyevo for his own amusement, including the so-called Peter's little boat, which would be considered the forefather of the Russian fleet. The Botik (small boat) museum chronicles the history of the first Russian fleet and keeps one of the original model boats.

In 1708, the town became a part of Moscow Governorate.

Just before the Moscow Olympics in 1980, the city of Moscow rounded up a large number of people it considered 'undesirable', many thousands, and decreed that they must be moved at least 120 km from Moscow in order to improve the city's image. Pereslavl is approx 130 km from Moscow and as such the population of the town soared prior to the Olympics.

Administrative and municipal status
Within the framework of administrative divisions, Pereslavl-Zalessky serves as the administrative center of Pereslavsky District, even though it is not a part of it. As an administrative division, it is incorporated separately as the town of oblast significance of Pereslavl-Zalessky—an administrative unit with the status equal to that of the districts. As a municipal division, the town of oblast significance of Pereslavl-Zalessky is incorporated as Pereslavl-Zalessky Urban Okrug.

Science and education
There is Institute for Program Systems of the Russian Academy of Sciences in the town. The University of Pereslavl is also based in the town.

Sights and architecture

The town is a part of the Golden Ring of Russia. Monuments of church architecture include six architecture complex convents and nine churches. Notable historic buildings are:
white stone Savior's Cathedral (1152–1157)
Church of Metropolitan Peter (1585)
Troitse-Danilov Monastery (16th–18th centuries)
Nikitsky Monastery (16th–19th centuries)
Feodorovsky Monastery (16th–19th centuries)
Goritsky Monastery (17th–18th centuries)

Museum and exhibits

Museum-Preserve of Pereslavl-Zalessky (in Goritsky Monastery)
Museum–Estate "The Little Boat of Peter the Great"
The Pereslavl Arboretum
Museum of Flat Irons
The Museum of Kettles
The Museum of Steam Engines

The original earthworks (which are still quite substantial) from the defensive wall that circled the town originally are still here, it is possible to walk along these defensive structures. As are portions if the original road that was at its base.

The town sits on the banks of Lake Pleschayevo, a large lake that draws tourists throughout the season. Kite surfing is particularly popular, as is camping.

Climate

Climate of Pereslavl-Zalessky is humid continental: long, cold and snowy winters and short, warm and rainy summers.

Notable people

Nicetas Stylites,  (??-1186) a 12th-century Russian saint who founded the Monastery of St. Nicetas 
Alexander Nevsky, (1221–1263) prince and saint.
Pavel Kolendas, (1820-??) Russian portrait painter 
Dmitry Mirimanoff (1861–1945) mathematician, contributed to axiomatic set theory 
Dmitry Kardovsky, (1866–1943) an artist, illustrator and stage designer.
Leonid Kurchevsky, (1890–1937 or 1939) a Russian/Soviet weapons designer.
Mikhail Koshkin, (1898–1940) designed the T-34 tank
Alexander Petrov, (born 1987) actor

References

Notes

Sources

Further reading
 Pereslavl-Zalessky. Materials for the History of the 17th and 18th centuries (1884) (Переславль-Залесский. Материалы для истории города XVII и XVIII столетий) at Runivers.ru in DjVu and PDF formats

External links

 
Audio guide to Pereslavl-Zalessky tourismpereslavl.ru
Guide to Pereslavl
Peter the Great's small boats (PDF)
Railway museum at Pereslavl-Zalessky (narrow gauge)
Lakeside idylls at Pereslavl-Zalessky
Guide to Golden Ring of Russia 
Guide to Pereslavl-Zalessky 

 
Pereslavsky Uyezd
1152 establishments in Europe
12th-century establishments in Russia
Golden Ring of Russia